Severe Tropical Storm Bilis, known in the Philippines as Tropical Storm Florita, was a weak tropical cyclone in July 2006 that caused catastrophic damage to areas of the Philippines, Taiwan, and southeastern China. The word Bilis, submitted by the Philippines, means 'speed' or 'swiftness' in Tagalog.

Despite never officially reaching typhoon strength, Bilis was responsible for $4.4 billion (2006 USD) in damage and 859 fatalities in the Philippines, Taiwan, and China. Most of the damage was caused by heavy rain, which triggered widespread flash flooding and landslides. Many of the areas Bilis flooded were later affected by Typhoon Kaemi, Typhoon Prapiroon, and intense Typhoon Saomai.

Meteorological history

A tropical disturbance developed northeast of Yap on July 7 and slowly increased in organization. The Joint Typhoon Warning Center (JTWC) issued a Tropical Cyclone Formation Alert on the disturbance later that day as it moved northwestward. By July 8, it had developed sufficient convection to be designated a tropical depression by the JTWC and the Japan Meteorological Agency (JMA). The depression continued to strengthen, and was designated Tropical Storm Bilis by the JMA early on July 9. The JTWC upgraded Bilis to tropical storm status later that day. On July 10, Bilis moved into the area of responsibility of the Philippine Atmospheric, Geophysical and Astronomical Services Administration (PAGASA), and was designated Tropical Storm Florita for local warnings.

Over the next several days, Bilis moved generally northwestward toward Taiwan, slowly strengthening over open waters. Bilis was designated a severe tropical storm by the JMA on July 11, but the storm did not strengthen much further over the next few days due to a marginal upper-air environment and dry air entrainment. PAGASA upgraded the system to typhoon status on July 12, but the JMA never officially recognized the system as such in its advisories. Bilis reached its official peak intensity of  later that day.

After moving across northern Taiwan, Bilis made its second landfall in Fujian, China early on July 14 at the same intensity, then weakened into a tropical depression over land the next day. Bilis lingered as a tropical depression over southeastern China before degenerating into a remnant low on July 16. But the JMA carried the system as a tropical depression until July 17. Despite becoming a remnant low, the remnants of Bilis maintained their identity for several days while moving westward over China, bringing heavy rains to inland areas.

Preparations

Storm Signal Number 1 ( was raised for most of central Luzon, including much of the Cordillera Administrative Region and the northern half of the Ilocos Region. Schools and government offices in those regions were closed.

The provincial observatory of Fujian issued a typhoon warning for the province on July 11, well in advance of Bilis' final landfall. In response to the warning, officials evacuated over 800,000 people from Hunan and 70,000 from Zhejiang. In addition, 256,000 fishermen and workers were evacuated from coastal areas in southeastern China, and 220,000 ships were ordered to return to port. In Shanghai, the evacuations caused significant rail and bus delays, and more than 210 flights in and out of the city were canceled prior to landfall.

Impact

Philippines
The strongest winds and heaviest rains were south and east of Bilis' center, and its outer rainbands swept across Luzon in the Philippines, causing heavy rains, wind gusts to tropical storm force, flash flooding, and landslides. Bilis was responsible for 45 million pesos in damage and at least 14 deaths, including three in Baguio, and six more in the Manila area.

Taiwan

Damage was light in Taiwan, due to Bilis' quick movement across the northern coast of the island. The Republic of China government reported four deaths, two of which were the deaths of fishermen from mainland China whose boat ran aground on Matsu Island. Another man was electrocuted in the city of Taipei as a result of the storm. The cause of the fourth death is unknown.

China
The storm made its second landfall in Fujian province, China, which was the province most impacted by the tropical cyclone. A total of 92 deaths and 3 billion Chinese yuan in damage were caused by the system, mostly from flooding. Schools and tourist attractions in the province were closed for several days.

Flooding killed 39 people in eastern Guangxi and 183 people in Guangdong. Eight more people were killed in Yunnan when a flash flood swept away some road workers' huts. A weather station in Guangdong reported a 5-hour rainfall total of 360.6 mm (14.2 inches).

Several sections of the Beijing-Guangzhou railway, a main rail route in China, were blocked by flooding and landslides, causing many delays and diversions. One train was surrounded by floodwaters in Lechang, and passengers had to be evacuated to a nearby school. At least 274 trains were affected and the train company refunded nearly 2 million tickets. After three days of repair work, the rail service resumed normal operations on July 18.

Significant damage occurred in Hunan, where heavy flooding and mudslides destroyed over 31,000 homes and caused 526 deaths. Most of the damage and fatalities occurred in the village of Zixing, where local officials reported the flooding as the worst the area had seen in the past 100 years, and described the death toll as "unprecedented". In all, Bilis was responsible for 843 deaths, 208 people reported missing, and $4.4 billion (2006 USD) in damage to southeastern China.

Aftermath

Bilis and its associated flooding left over 400,000 people homeless, and over 2 million more had to be evacuated in the face of rising waters. Following the storm, the Red Cross Society of China provided food, blankets, and water purification kits to over 100,000 Hunan residents in mass evacuation shelters. The relief effort was complicated by an earthquake in Yunnan, as well as three more tropical cyclones: Typhoon Kaemi, Typhoon Prapiroon, and Typhoon Saomai. All of the storms were stronger than Bilis, and exacerbated flooding and other problems in the region.

Because of the sudden large increase in the number of reported deaths in Hunan in a matter of hours, Chinese government officials accused local officials of covering up damage and casualty details. The Ministry of Civil Affairs sent a team to Hunan to investigate the allegations, and issued a notice stating that anyone found to be covering up any damage details would be held accountable.

The China Meteorological Administration released a press release after the storm and gave four reasons for the extensive damage. First, the storm decelerated after landfall and maintained its identity for 120 hours while moving south of due west. Secondly, the storm was asymmetric and rainfall concentrated in the southern semicircle. Finally, previous rainfall had made the area wetter than normal and more prone to flooding.

At the 39th annual meeting of the ESCAP/WMO Typhoon Committee in Manila in December 2006, the name Bilis was retired, along with four other names. In December 2007, the committee selected the name Maliksi to replace Bilis on the Western Pacific basin name lists beginning in 2008.

See also 

 Typhoon Rananim
 Typhoon Fitow
 Typhoon Matsa

References

External links

RSMC Tokyo - Typhoon Center
Best Track Data of Severe Tropical Storm Bilis (0604) 
Best Track Data (Graphics) of Severe Tropical Storm Bilis (0604)
Best Track Data (Text)
JTWC Best Track Data of Tropical Storm 05W (Bilis)

Retired Pacific typhoons
2006 Pacific typhoon season
Typhoons in China
Tropical Storm Bilis
Western Pacific severe tropical storms
Bilis